Konstantin Alekseyevich Polezhayev (Russian: Константин Алексеевич Полежаев, born 14 August 1972) is a Russian politician who is currently the deputy governor of Belgorod Oblast on housing and communal services since 21 January 2019.

He served as the fifth head of Belgorod from 2015 to 2019.

Biography

Konstantin Polezhayev was born in Belgorod on 14 August 1972. 

He has higher education. In 1996, he graduated from the Kharkiv State Automobile and Road Technical University with a degree in civil engineering for the construction of roads and airfields.

From 1996 to October 2004, he worked as an engineer, deputy head of department, head of the technical supervision department of the State Institution "Department of Public Roads and Transport of the Administration of the Belgorod Oblast". From October 2004, he worked as acting, then chief engineer of the regional road administration. On 19 November 2007, he became the head of the State Institution "Department of Public Roads and Transport of the Administration of the Belgorod Region".

On 5 November 2013, Polezhaev was appointed First Deputy Mayor of Belgorod. On 7 October 2015, he worked as acting head of the Belgorod City Administration.

On 17 November 2015, he was officially elected mayor of Belgorod, as 32 out of 39 deputies voted for Polezhayev.

On 21 January 2019, he was appointed Deputy Governor of the Belgorod Oblast, as Head of the Housing and Utilities Department of the region.

References

1972 births
Living people
Russian politicians